Vyacheslav Vladimirovich Titarenko (born June 8, 1978) is a Kazakh former swimmer, who specialized in sprint freestyle events. He is a single-time Olympian (2004), and a top 16 finalist in the 100 m butterfly at the 2002 Asian Games in Busan, South Korea (58.22).

Titarenko qualified for the men's 100 m freestyle, as Kazakhstan's oldest swimmer (aged 26), at the 2004 Summer Olympics in Athens. He achieved a FINA B-standard of 51.91 from the Kazakhstan Open Championships in Almaty. He challenged seven other swimmers in heat three, including five-time Olympian Carl Probert of Fiji. He raced to sixth place in 52.09, just 0.18 of a second off his entry time. Titarenko failed to advance into the semifinals, as he placed fifty-first overall out of 71 swimmers in the preliminaries.

References

1978 births
Living people
Olympic swimmers of Kazakhstan
Swimmers at the 2004 Summer Olympics
Swimmers at the 2002 Asian Games
Kazakhstani male freestyle swimmers
Kazakhstani male butterfly swimmers
People from Karaganda Region
Asian Games competitors for Kazakhstan
Islamic Solidarity Games competitors for Kazakhstan
Islamic Solidarity Games medalists in swimming
20th-century Kazakhstani people
21st-century Kazakhstani people